The 1989 Edmonton Eskimos season was the 32nd season for the team in the Canadian Football League and their 41st overall. The Eskimos finished the season in first place with a CFL record 16 wins and a 16–2 record. They appeared in the West Final where they lost to the Saskatchewan Roughriders.

Pre-season

Schedule

Regular season

Standings

Season Schedule

Total attendance: 280,567 
Average attendance: 31,174 (51.9%)

Playoffs

Schedule

Awards
CFL's Most Outstanding Player Award – Tracy Ham
Dave Dryburgh Memorial Trophy – Jerry Kauric
Jeff Nicklin Memorial Trophy – Tracy Ham
Norm Fieldgate Trophy – Danny Bass

References

Edmonton Elks seasons
Edmonton Eskimos Season, 1989